Grand Flaneur (1877-1900) was an outstanding Australian Thoroughbred racehorse and sire, who won nine successive races, including the AJC Derby, the Victoria Derby and the 1880 Melbourne Cup, before he retired undefeated. He had won races over distances ranging from five furlongs to three miles. He was the Leading sire in Australia in 1895 and was close to the top of the list for a decade.

Pedigree
He was bred by Edward K. Cox at his Fernhill Stud near Mulgoa, New South Wales. Grand Flaneur was by the good racehorse and sire, Yattendon (sire of Chester, who was also bred by Cox), his dam was the imported First Lady (by St. Albans) who traced directly to the noted mare, Banter.

Race record

Two-year-old
 Won 1880 VRC Normanby Stakes 5 furlongs (by a half length)

Three-year-old
 Won 1880 AJC Derby over 12 furlongs (by a half length)
 Won 1880 AJC Mares Produce Stakes 10 furlongs (by 1½ lengths)
 Won 1880 VRC Mares Produce Stakes 10 furlongs (by 1½ lengths) 
 Won 1880 Melbourne Cup 16 furlongs (by 1 length)  
 Won 1880 VRC Victoria Derby 12 furlongs (by 1 length) 
 Won 1881 VRC Champion Stakes 24 furlongs (by 1 length)
 Won 1881 VRC St Leger Stakes 14 furlongs (by 1½ lengths)
 Won 1881 VRC Town Plate 16 furlongs (by 1 length)

Stud record
After an injury Grand Flaneur was retired to Andrew Town’s Hobartville Stud at Richmond, New South Wales. Grand Flaneur sired the Melbourne Cup winner, Bravo, in his first crop. He was the leading Australian sire in 1894–95 and was then standing at Long’s Chipping Norton Stud. Grand Flaneur sired 23 stakes winners for 45 stakes wins and more than £50,000, including, Hopscotch (AJC Epsom Handicap etc.), Merman (GB Ascot Gold Cup and GB Goodwood Cup), Parthian (AJC St Leger Stakes, VRC St Leger Stakes etc.) and Patron (Melbourne Cup).

Grand Flaneur died in 1900 at the Chipping Norton Stud, near Liverpool, New South Wales where he is buried.
Grand Flaneur Beach in Chipping Norton is named after him.

In 2007 Grand Flaneur was inducted into the Australian Racing Hall of Fame.

See also
 List of leading Thoroughbred racehorses

References

1877 racehorse births
1900 racehorse deaths
Australian Racing Hall of Fame horses
Champion Thoroughbred Sires of Australia
Melbourne Cup winners
Victoria Derby winners
Racehorses bred in Australia
Racehorses trained in Australia
Undefeated racehorses
Thoroughbred family 14-a